Harborough Town Football Club is a football club based in  Market Harborough, Leicestershire, England.

History
The club was established in 1975 as a youth team under the name Harborough Town Juniors, with the modern club formed by a merger with adult team Spencer United in 2008. Spencer United joined Division Five of the Leicester & District Mutual League in 1976. They were Division Five champions in 1977–78 and were promoted to Division Two. A third-place finish the following season saw them promoted to Division One. Although the club were relegated back to Division Two three seasons later, they were Division Two runners-up in 1987–88 and promoted to the Premier Division. In 1996 they joined Division One of the Northamptonshire Combination.

Spencer United were Northamptonshire Combination Division One champions in 1997–98, earning promotion to the Premier Division. In 2002 the club were renamed Harborough Spencer United. They were relegated back to Division One after finishing bottom of the Premier Division in 2004–05, and were subsequently renamed Harborough Town Spencers in 2006. During the 2007–08 season, the club were amalgamated into Harborough Town, adopting their name. They ended the season as Division One runners-up, earning promotion to the Premier Division.

In 2009–10 Harborough were Premier Division champions, earning promotion to Division One of the United Counties League. Although they finished bottom of Division One in their first season in the league, the club were Division One runners-up in 2011–12 and were promoted to the Premier Division. In 2021–22 they were Premier Division South champions, earning promotion to Division One Midlands of the Northern Premier League.

Honours

United Counties League
Premier Division South champions 2021–22
Northamptonshire Combination
Premier Division champions 2009–10
Leicester & District Mutual League
Division Five champions 1977–78

Records
Best FA Cup performance: Preliminary round, 2013–14, 2015–16, 2016–17, 2018–19, 2020–21
Best FA Vase performance: Fourth round, 2021–22

See also
Harborough Town F.C. players

References

External links

 
Football clubs in England
Football clubs in Leicestershire
1975 establishments in England
Association football clubs established in 1975
Market Harborough
Northamptonshire Combination Football League
United Counties League
Northern Premier League clubs